Sharif Khalilov (born 28 October 1989) is an Uzbekistani Paralympic judoka. He represented Uzbekistan at the Summer Paralympics in 2012, 2016 and 2020 and he won the silver medal in the men's 73 kg event in 2012. He also won one of the bronze medals in the men's 100 kg event at the 2020 Summer Paralympics held in Tokyo, Japan.

At the 2010 Asian Para Games he won the silver medal in the men's 73 kg event.

References

External links 
 

1989 births
Living people
Uzbekistani male judoka
Paralympic judoka of Uzbekistan
Paralympic silver medalists for Uzbekistan
Paralympic bronze medalists for Uzbekistan
Paralympic medalists in judo
Judoka at the 2012 Summer Paralympics
Judoka at the 2016 Summer Paralympics
Judoka at the 2020 Summer Paralympics
Medalists at the 2012 Summer Paralympics
Medalists at the 2020 Summer Paralympics
Place of birth missing (living people)
21st-century Uzbekistani people